The following is a list of prominent Kodavas (also known as the Coorg or Coorgi community).

Gallery

Religion 
 Kalyatanda Ponnappa (c.1600), religious leader and warrior who is now worshipped as a demi-god
 Sadguru Appayya Swami (1885–1956), (born of Kodava parents) founder of Kaveri Ashram, a Hindu monastery in Virajpet, born as Palanganda Appaiah, ordained into Sannyas (monkhood) by Guru Ramgiri.
 Swami Narayanananda
 Swami Shambhavananda

Freedom Fighters 
 Kannanda Doddayya, who defeated Hyder Ali thrice
 Mathanda Appachu, defeated the British in battle in 1834
 Pandyanda Belliappa (also called Pandianda Belliappa or P I Belliappa) Gandhian, freedom fighter, politician, journalist
 C M Poonacha (Cheppudira Muthanna Poonacha) Gandhian, freedom fighter, politician

Armed forces 

 Field Marshal K M Cariappa (Kodandera family), OBE, first Indian Commissioned Officer, later became first Indian General and then first Commander-in-Chief of India. High Commissioner (Ambassador in the Commonwealth) of India in Australia and New Zealand, Field Marshal in 1986. Residency Road and a park in Bangalore has been renamed after him.
 General K. S. Thimayya (Kodandera), DSO, secured Ladakh for India during the Kashmir War of 1948, General and Chief of the Indian Army, after retirement he led the UN peacekeeping forces during when he won International acclaim, Chairman of the Repatriation Committee after Korean War, died in Cyprus, his statue was set up in Singapore Wax Museum, the Cyprus Govt. issued stamps in his honour. Richmond Road in Bangalore has been renamed after him.
 General A C Iyappa, first chief of Bharat Electronics Limited
 Squadron Leader A B Devaiah (Ajjamada), who shot down an enemy aircraft before presumably dying in Pakistan during the 1965 war. He is the only Air Force officer to be awarded the Maha Vir Chakra posthumously.
 Mangerira Chinnappa Muthanna Army Martyr
 Squadron Leader Mandepanda Appachu Ganapathy, Maha Vir Chakra awardee, IAF fighter pilot who shot down a PAF sabre during the Battle of Boyra, Indo-Pakistan War of 1971.
 Lieutenant General Channira Bansi Ponnappa, former UN Peacekeeper
 Pattacheruvanda C. Thimayya, Lieutenant General of Indian Army

Sports 
 Ashwini Ponnappa - Indian badminton player 
 Jagat and Anita Nanjappa - motor racers
 Joshna Chinappa - Indian squash player 
 Rohan Bopanna - Indian tennis player 
 K. C. Cariappa, professional cricketer
 Robin Uthappa, Indian Cricketer
Ashwini Nachappa, Arjuna Awardee, India's sprint queen

Hockey 
Kodavas have a long history of association with the game of field hockey. The district of Kodagu is considered as the cradle of Indian hockey.
 A B Subbaiah, Indian field hockey goalkeeper and coach.
 Len Aiyappa, Indian field hockey player. 
 M. M. Somaya, Indian field hockey player.
 M. P. Ganesh, Indian field hockey captain and coach.
 S. K. Uthappa, Indian field hockey player.

Civil office 
 B. B. Ashok Kumar, police officer
 C B Muthamma (Chonira), first woman Indian Foreign Service officer
 C. G. Somiah, first IAS Officer from Coorg to rise to be the Home Secretary, Chief Vigilance Commissioner (CVC) and Comptroller and Auditor General.
Diwan Bahadur Ketoli Chengappa, administrator (Chief Commissioner of Coorg province)

Law and order 
 Rao Bahadur IGP P.K.Monnappa (Pemmanda), IPS Officer, DGP of Madras, helped suppress the Nizam's rebellion in Hyderabad in 1950 as part of the Police Action led by Sardar Patel, IGP of Hyderabad then of Mysore, also first police chief of Karnataka and Andhra Pradesh.

 A. S. Bopanna (Ajjikuttira Somaiah Bopanna) is a Judge of Supreme Court of India. He is former Chief Justice of Gauhati High Court. He is also former Judge of Karnataka High Court. He was born in Madikeri, Kodagu on 20 May 1959.

Actors 
 Prema (Kannada actress)
 Rashmika Mandanna
 Gulshan Devaiah

Literature 
 Appachcha Kavi (also called Appachu Kavi), playwright
 Boverianda Nanjamma and Chinnappa, translators, authors 
 B D Ganapathy
 I. M. Muthanna, author and translator
 Nadikerianda Chinnappa, folklore compiler

Entrepreneurs 
N S Narendra, Firepro founder

Politics 
 Prema Cariappa, Mayor of Bangalore, Rajya Sabha MP
Appachu Ranjan, former sports minister, Government of Karnataka

Music
Biddu Appaiah is a Kodava (Coorgi) by birth. He is a British Indian musician and winner of Grammy award. He was pivotal in the career success of sister-brother duo, Nazia and Zoheb Hassan

References 

Kodavas
Kodava people